Paolo Berlusconi (born 6 December 1949) is an Italian businessman. He is the younger brother of the former Italian prime minister  Silvio Berlusconi. He is the publisher of the newspaper Il Giornale and the head of the investment group Paolo Berlusconi Finanzaria.

Personal life
Paolo Berlusconi is the third child in a middle class Milan family and the younger brother of Silvio Berlusconi.

He has four children, two from his first marriage with Mariella Bocciardo (Alessia and Luna Roberta), and two from his second marriage with Antonia Rosa (Davide Luigi and Nicole). In 1996, he divorced his second wife and from 2000 he had a relationship with the model Katia Noventa and from 2001 to 2006 with the showgirl Natalia Estrada.

Career
In 1990, an Italian law was passed that prohibited the simultaneous ownership of a newspaper and a television station (the Mammi Law). Thereafter Silvio Berlusconi, owner of three television channels and the daily Il Giornale, ceded control of the newspaper to his brother Paolo. Silvio kept a minority interest through the Mondadori group. , Paolo is still the co-owner of Società Europea di Edizioni, the publisher of Il Giornale.

Since the early nineties, the Paolo Berlusconi Finanziaria S.r.l (PBF) bought part of Fininvest as well as directly investing in various other sectors such as construction (Italcantieri), real estate (gruppo Edilnord), textile (Zambieti) and media (Solari.com S.r.l). In 2011, PBF strengthened its influence in the publishing sector by acquiring a majority share of the newspaper Il Foglio, taking over the 38% of the shares held by Veronica Lario, the second wife of Silvio Berlusconi.

On 3 February 2013 Paolo Berlusconi, in his capacity as vice-chairman of AC Milan, appeared to be caught on video referring to footballer Mario Balotelli in racially derogatory terms. Berlusconi claimed the remarks were meant to be affectionate and not derogatory.

Judicial inquiries
In 2002, Paolo Berlusconi was charged with fraud and corruption for his involvement as head of Simec in a landfill scandal in Cerro Maggiore near Milan. He was conditionally sentenced to one year and nine months in prison and fined a sum of 49 million euro.

In June 2009, Paolo Berlusconi and the S.E.G. (Societa Europea Golf) had to pay 4.5 million euro in compensation and 150,000 euro in legal fees to the commune of Pieve Emanuele.

On 12 January 2010, he was sentenced to 4 months in prison for falsifying invoices.

Notes

External links
Storia del processo per l'ex discarica di Milano
Storia di Paolo Berlusconi nella vicenda Simec

Italian newspaper publishers (people)
Italian publishers (people)
Italian fraudsters
1949 births
Living people
Paolo
Criminals from Milan
A.C. Milan directors
Fininvest
20th-century Italian businesspeople
21st-century Italian businesspeople
21st-century Italian criminals
Businesspeople from Milan